  
Pinchbeck is a village and civil parish in the  South Holland district of Lincolnshire, England. The civil parish population was 5,153 at the 2001 census, 5,455 at the 2011 census and 6,011 at the 2021 census.

The name Pinchbeck is derived from either the Old English pinc+bece (Minnow Stream) or pinca+bece (Finch Ridge). A family long associated with the area took its name from the village, one member of which was Christopher Pinchbeck, a watchmaker responsible for the invention of the Pinchbeck alloy, which was once used for imitating gold in cheap jewellery.

The Anglican village church is dedicated to Saint Mary, and is over 1,000 years old. It has a wide nave with mid-12th-century arches, and a 15th-century single hammer-beam roof supported by large gilded angels carrying the heraldic escutcheons of the Pinchbeck family. The chancel is by restorer Herbert Butterfield.

Village schools are Pinchbeck East C of E School Primary School and Pinchbeck West St Bartholomew's C of E Primary School.

Pinchbeck Marsh
Pinchbeck falls within the drainage area of the Welland and Deepings Internal Drainage Board.  The board maintains Pinchbeck Engine House, a museum which houses a drain engine, built to drain Pinchbeck Marsh in the early 19th century.

The marsh is also the location of the highest point in the Parts of Holland, an historic division of Lincolnshire. Visiting this lowest peak near Vernatt's Drain is of interest to participants in the sport of Hill bagging and Highpointing.

References

External links

Pinchbeck East C of E Primary School
Burtey Fen Collection

Villages in Lincolnshire
Civil parishes in Lincolnshire
South Holland, Lincolnshire